Mathilde Gerg (born 19 October 1975) is a German former alpine skier.

Career
She was Olympic Champion in the Slalom at the 1998 Winter Olympics, an astounding win as most of her career she was known as predominantly a speed specialist; with 1998 being the one year of her career she was a top slalom contender with 2 wins and numerous podiums on the World Cup, finishing 3rd in points for the season.   At the World Championships she was bronze medallist in Combined and Super-G at Sestriere 1997, Bronze medallist in Super-G at St. Anton 2001, and gold medallist in Nation Team Event at Bormio in 2005.

In 1994, Gerg was Junior World Champion and in 1997 and 2002 she won the World Cup in her favourite discipline, Super-G.  Her 1997 Super G season title came due to decisive points' leader Pernilla Wiberg going off course in the final Super G of the season.   She also has twice won the combined season Crystal Globe, and twice narrowly missed the downhill season title, finishing 2nd in the points in both 2004 and 2005. She was 2nd in the Overall title standings in 1999, losing the Overall title to Alexandra Meissnitzer.

Gerg retired from professional skiing, because of severe injuries, in November 2005.

Her cousin, Annemarie Gerg, was also a member of the German alpine ski team.

World Cup results

Season standings

Season titles

Race victories 
 20 wins – (7 DH, 1 SL, 8 SG, 3 SC, 1 Parallel slalom)

See also
List of FIS Alpine Ski World Cup women's race winners

References

External links
 
 

1975 births
Living people
People from Bad Tölz-Wolfratshausen
Sportspeople from Upper Bavaria
German female alpine skiers
Olympic alpine skiers of Germany
Alpine skiers at the 1994 Winter Olympics
Alpine skiers at the 1998 Winter Olympics
Alpine skiers at the 2002 Winter Olympics
Olympic gold medalists for Germany
Olympic bronze medalists for Germany
Olympic medalists in alpine skiing
FIS Alpine Ski World Cup champions
Medalists at the 1998 Winter Olympics
20th-century German women